The 2011–12 Gonzaga Bulldogs men's basketball team represented Gonzaga University in the 2011–12 NCAA Division I men's basketball season. The Bulldogs (also informally referred to as the "Zags"), members of the West Coast Conference, were led by head coach Mark Few, in his 13th season at the school. The Zags played most of their home games at the McCarthey Athletic Center on the university campus in Spokane, Washington, but played one home game at Spokane Arena, located in downtown Spokane about 2 miles (3 km) from the Gonzaga campus. The team also played one game at KeyArena in Seattle, a contest billed as the "Battle in Seattle". This season, the Zags also played a game against Hawaii at Rogers Arena in Vancouver, BC. It was something of a homecoming for center Robert Sacre who is from North Vancouver. The Zags had three Canadians on this year's roster, one of whom (Kelly Olynyk) was redshirted and did not play in 2011–12.

They finished the season 26–7, 13–3 in WCC play to finish in second place. They lost in the championship game of the West Coast Basketball tournament to Saint Mary's. They received an at-large bid to the 2012 NCAA tournament, their 14th straight tournament bid, where they defeated West Virginia in the second round before falling in the third round to Ohio State.

Preseason
In 2011–12, the Gonzaga Bulldogs men's basketball team were in their 32nd season as a member of the West Coast Conference. Since 2004, the team has played their home games at the McCarthey Athletic Center, which has a capacity of 6,000.

Departures

Incoming transfers

2011 recruiting class

Roster

Schedule

|-
!colspan=9| Exhibition

|-
!colspan=9| Regular Season

|-
!colspan=9| 2012 West Coast Conference men's basketball tournament

|-
!colspan=9| 2012 NCAA tournament

|-

References

Gonzaga
Gonzaga Bulldogs men's basketball seasons
Gonzaga
Gonzaga Bulldogs men's basketball
Gonzaga Bulldogs men's basketball